National Route 226 is a national highway of Japan connecting Minamisatsuma, Kagoshima and Kagoshima, Kagoshima in Japan, with a total length of 157.4 km (97.8 mi).

References

National highways in Japan
Roads in Kagoshima Prefecture